Angelica and Medoro was a popular subject for Romantic painters, composers and writers from the 16th until the 19th century.  Angelica and Medoro are two characters from the 16th-century Italian epic Orlando Furioso by Ludovico Ariosto. Angelica was an Asian princess at the court of Charlemagne who fell in love with the Saracen knight Medoro, and eloped with him to China. While in the original work, Orlando was the main character, many adaptations focused purely or mainly on the love between Angelica and Medoro, with the favourite scenes in paintings being Angelica nursing Medoro, and Angelica carving their names into a tree, a scene which was the theme of at least 25 paintings between 1577 and 1825.

Episodes in the story

Angelica and Medoro are on different sides in the war, and their first encounter is when Angelica comes across the wounded Medoro. He has been wounded in a skirmish with Scottish knights, in which his two friends Cloridano and Dardinello were killed. They may be shown lying dead. In the poem Ariosto describes how Cupid, annoyed with Angelica's disdain for love, waits beside Medoro for Angelica with an arrow fitted in his bow. He may be shown firing this at her.

Angelica takes Medoro off to a shepherd's hut, and nurses him there, falling in love with him in the process. When he is fully recovered they depart. The Villa Valmarana Tiepolo cycle (1757) shows both scenes.  The most popular scene in art is of the lovers carving their names into a tree in a sylvan setting; most often Angelica is shown doing the carving. It is when the hero Orlando, who is in love with Angelica, finds the names that he becomes furioso or mad.

Incomplete list of artists depicting Angelica and Medoro
 Andrea Casali Angelica and Medoro,   1750
 Nicolas-Sébastien Adam, Angélique et Médor, 1753
François Boucher, Angelica and Medoro, 1763
Ludovico Carracci, Angelica and Medoro, two heads
Eugène Delacroix, Angelica and the wounded Medoro,  1860
Angelica Kauffman, The Loves of Angelica and Medoro
Laurent de La Hyre, Angelica and Medoro, 1641
Teodoro Matteini, after a design by Raphael Sanzio Morghen
Marcantonio Raimondi, Angelica e Medoro, after Giulio Romano
Joshua Reynolds, Angelica and Medoro
Bonifazio Veronese, Angelica e Medoro
Benjamin West, Angelica and Medoro, 1763–1764
John Wootton, Landscape with Angela and Medoro, in the Royal Albert Memorial Museum in Exeter
Michael Stroy, Angelika und Medor, (1833), a scene from the epic Orlando Furioso

Gallery

Angelica nurses the wounded Medoro

List of authors writing about Angelica and Medoro

Francisco de Aldana (1537–1578), Medoror y Angélica, describing their adventures after the end of the Orlando Furioso
Luis Barahona de Soto, Primera parte de la Angélica (1586), also describing the adventures after the ending of the Furioso
Lope de Vega, La hermosura de Angélica (1602)
Luis de Góngora, En un pastoral albergue, 1602, depicting the honeymoon of Angelica and Medoro
José de Cañizares, Angélica y Medoro, 1722

List of composers writing about Angelica and Medoro

Libretto by Andrea Salvadori
Jacopo Peri and Marco da Gagliano, Lo sposalizio di Medoro e Angelica, 1619

Libretto by Metastasio
Nicola Antonio Porpora, Angelica e Medoro (Porpora), 1720, which marked the debut of Farinelli
Giovanni Battista Mele, Angelica e Medoro, 1747

Libretto by Leopoldo de Villati
Carl Heinrich Graun, Angelica e Medoro (3 acts, 1749)

Libretto by Carlo Vedova
Giovanni Battista Lampugnani, Angelica e Medoro, 1738
Giovanni Battista Pescetti, Angelica e Medoro, 1739

Libretto by Gaetano Sertor
Gaetano Andreozzi, Angelica e Medoro, 1791

Other
Vito Giuseppe Milicco and Domenico Cimarosa, Angelica e Medoro, 1783, a cantate

Notes

Further reading

 Julius A. Molinaro, Angelica and Medoro; The Development of a Motif from the Renaissance to the Baroque, 1954
 Rensselaer W. Lee, Names on trees : Ariosto into art, Princeton University Press, 1977, 124 pages, .

Characters in Orlando Innamorato and Orlando Furioso
1753 paintings
1763 paintings
Fictional couples
Literary duos
Fictional princesses
Fictional knights